Annapolis West was a provincial electoral district in Nova Scotia, Canada, that elected one member of the Nova Scotia House of Assembly. It existed from 1956 to 1993.  Prior to 1956, it was a part of the district of Annapolis County.

It was abolished when it was merged into Digby-Annapolis.

Members of the Legislative Assembly
Greg Kerr, Progressive Conservative (1978–1993)
Peter M. Nicholson, Liberal (1956–1978)

Election results

1956 general election

1960 general election

1963 general election

1967 general election

1970 general election

1974 general election

1978 general election

1981 general election

1984 general election

1988 general election

References
Elections Nova Scotia - Summary Results from 1867 to 2011 (PDF)

Former provincial electoral districts of Nova Scotia